Cuthbert Collingwood (1826–1908) was an English naturalist, surgeon and physician.

Life
Born at Greenwich on 25 December 1826, he was fifth of six sons of Samuel Collingwood (1786–1852), an architect and contractor, of Wellington Grove, Greenwich, and his wife Frances, daughter of Samuel Collingwood (1762–1841), printer to the Clarendon Press. Educated at King's College School, he matriculated at Christ Church, Oxford, on 8 April 1845, and graduated B.A. in 1849, proceeding M.A. in 1852 and M.B. in 1854. He subsequently studied at Edinburgh University and at Guy's Hospital, and spent some time in the medical schools of Paris and Vienna.

From 1858 to 1866 Collingwood held the appointment of lecturer on botany to the Liverpool Royal Infirmary School of Medicine. In 1866–7 he served as surgeon and naturalist on HMS Rifleman and HMS Serpent on voyages  in the China Seas, and made researches in marine zoology. Elected Fellow of the Linnean Society in 1853, he served on its council in 1868. He also lectured on biology at the Liverpool School of Science. He became senior physician of the Northern Hospital in Liverpool and took part in the intellectual life of the city. In 1876–7 he travelled in Palestine and Egypt.

At the end of his life, Collingwood lived in Paris, where he died on 20 October 1908.

Works
In 1865 Collingwood issued Twenty-one Essays on Various Subjects, Scientific and Literary, and he wrote on his expedition in Rambles of a Naturalist on the Shores and Waters of the China Seas (1868). He wrote also The Travelling Birds (1872), and forty papers on natural history in scientific periodicals.

Collingwood was a prominent member of the New Jerusalem Church. He published expositions of his religious beliefs, including: A Vision of Creation, a poem with a geological introduction (1872); New Studies in Christian Theology (anon. 1883); and The Bible and the Age, Principles of Consistent Interpretation (1886).

Family
Collingwood married Clara (died 1871), daughter of Lieut.-col. Sir Robert Mowbray of Cockavine, Scotland; they had no children.

Notes

External links
Attribution

1826 births
1908 deaths
English naturalists
19th-century English medical doctors
English Swedenborgians